Maghreb Association Sportive de Fès is a Moroccan professional football club based in Fez, that competes in Botola, the top flight of Moroccan football. 

The club was founded in 1946. The club has traditionally worn a yellow home kit since inception. Maghreb de Fès is a well known club for the success of its football section, very popular in and outside the country. The team has played its home matches in the 45,000 capacity Fez Stadium in downtown Fez since 2007

Maghreb de Fès established itself as a major force in both Moroccan and African football during the 20th century. In domestic football, the club has won 10 trophies; 4 Botola titles, 4 Moroccan Throne Cup and Botola 2 (Morocco second tier) twice. In continental and global competitions, Maghreb Fez have won 2 trophies; one CAF Confederation Cup and one CAF Super Cup.

History 
The Maghreb Fez team is considered one of the founding teams of Moroccan football. Since its founding in 1946, it played a pioneering role, as it was the first non-French team to reach the prize pool in the French Cup, but it met with the big and famous Red Star team at the time. 

Since the establishment of the Moroccan championship in 1956, the Maghreb Fez has gained its position with the strong and competed with them for the Moroccan League Championship. Maghreb El Fez has all the characteristics of an independent team, i.e. an office, a president, and financial resources that were provided by the rich of the city. And that was in 1965 through players who carved their names on the Fezian ball, but were not lucky in the years 1966, 1971 and 1974 after losing the Moroccan Throne Cup final, to return after that and pay the debt and win the national championship title in 1979 from the team that formed half of the national team such as Mohammed Hazzaz, Liman, Abdallah Tazi and Al-Zahrawi To come after them, the generation of the eighties, who won the Throne Cup title for the first time in 1980, immediately after winning the title in 1979, and increased the treasury of Morocco Fez with two successive titles of the first national championship in 1983 and the second in 1985.

In 1988, Maghreb Fez won the 1987–88 Moroccan Throne Cup after defeating ASFAR 4–2 on penalties in the final. They lost the Coupe du Trône five times in 1993 after the 1–0 defeat by Kawkab Marrakech, 1–0 defeat by Wydad in 2001, 2–0 defeat by Raja in 2002, 1–0 defeat by ASFAR in 2008 and 2–1 defeat by FUS Rabat in 2010 before managing to win the 2011 Moroccan Throne Cup after defeating COD Meknès 1–0 in the final. Maghreb fez defeated Wydad AC in the semi-finals of the throne cup, which is known to be one of the biggest upset in the history of Moroccan football.

In the 2011 CAF Confederation Cup, They played their first group match in Fez Stadium in which they won 1–0 against JS Kabylie, scored by Chemseddine Chtibi in the 85th minute. They drew their second against Motema Pembe and won their third against Sunshine Stars. Maghreb Fez won two and drew one of their 2nd leg matches, They defeated JS Kabylie (1–0) and defeated  Motema Pembe (3–0), while they drew 1–1 against Sunshine Stars. Maghreb Fez qualified to the knockout stages after finishing top in the group stages winning four matches and drawing two. In the semi-finals they defeated G.D. Interclube on penalties. They were proclaimed Champions after defeating Club Africain in the final. They automatically qualified to the 2012 CAF Super Cup, in which they defeated Espérance ST and won their second African title for the team. 

In 2016, they won their 4th Moroccan Throne Cup after defeating Olympic Safi (2–1) in the final, both goals scored by Guiza Djédjé.

Grounds 
The stadium has been welcoming the team since 2007 at the Fez Stadium, which has a capacity of 45,000 spectators. The construction of the sports complex began in early 1992, and it was expected to be completed in February 1997, as it was scheduled to host the African Youth Cup next to the honorary stadium of Meknes, but the failure to complete the workshops prevented that, after the completion period knew stops And several failures as a result of technical problems added to the original financial envelope in financing the project, which was what led the interests of the guardianship ministry and the urban group of Fez in 1999 to find another support for the completion of the project, The urban group contributed three million euros, and the concerned ministry contributed eight million euros, while the amount allocated for the completion of this sports landmark, which has a capacity of 45 thousand spectators, was estimated at 35 million euros. Construction and equipment works were completed in 2003.

Highest recorded attendance is 50,000 spectators on 4 December 2011, in which it witnessed Maghreb fez play against Club Africain in the 2011 CAF Confederation Cup final.

Current squad

Supporters
The official supporter group of MAS are the Fatal Tigers. They were formed in 2006.

Honours
Moroccan League First Division
Winners (4):1965, 1979, 1983, 1985
Runner-up : 1961, 1969, 1973, 1975, 1978, 1989, 2011

Coupe du Trône
Winners (4):1980, 1988, 2011, 2016
Runner-up : 1966, 1971, 194, 1993, 2001, 2002, 2008, 2010

Moroccan League Second Division
Winners (2):1997, 2006

CAF Confederation Cup
Winners (1):2011

CAF Super Cup
Winners (1):2012

Performance in CAF competitions
CAF Champions League: 1 appearance
2012 – Second Round

 African Cup of Champions Clubs: 2 appearances
1984 – Quarter-finals
1986 – Second Round

CAF Confederation Cup: 5 appearances
2009 – First Round
2011 – Champion
2012 – Play-off round
2014 – First Round
2017 – Play-off round

CAF Cup Winners' Cup: 2 appearances
1990 – Second Round
2003 – First Round

CAF Super Cup: 1 appearance
2012 – Champion

Managers

 Alexandru Moldovan (1995–96)
  Ivica Todorov (1996–97)
 Aurel Țicleanu (1997–99)
 Zaki Badou (July 1, 2001 – June 30, 2002)
 Aurel Țicleanu (2002)
 Aziz El Amri (2002–03)
 Aurel Țicleanu (2003–04)
 Jaouad Milani (2004–06)
 Abderrazak Khairi (2006)
 Oscar Fulloné (2007)
 Pierre Lechantre (2007 – Jan 08)
 Jean-Christian Lang (2008)
 Lamine N'Diaye (July 1, 2008–09)
 Mohamed Fakhir (2009)
 Abdelhadi Sektioui (2010)
 Rachid Taoussi (2010–12)
 Tarik Sektioui (2012)
 Azzedine Aït Djoudi (Oct 30, 2012 – June 30, 2013)
 Tarik Sektioui (July 1, 2013 – Oct 14, 2013)
 Charly Rössli (Nov 1, 2013 – Feb 18, 2014)
 Abderrahim Taleb (2014)
 Franck Dumas (Aug 2014–14)
 Rachid Taoussi (2015)
 Denis Lavagne (2015– March 2016)
 Mohamed Al Achhabi (2016)
 Oussama Bouiraaman (2020)
 David Boulogne(2022-)

Rival Clubs
  Wydad Fez (Derby)
  CODM Meknes (Rivalry)
   ASFAR (football club) 
  ES Tunis (Rivalry)

References

External links
Fan Website

Football clubs in Morocco
Association football clubs established in 1946
Sport in Fez, Morocco
1946 establishments in Morocco
Sports clubs in Morocco
 
CAF Confederation Cup winning clubs
CAF Super Cup winning clubs